"Private Channel" is the third segment of the thirty-third episode and the ninth episode of the second season (1986–87) of the television series The Twilight Zone. In this segment, a teenage boy accidentally acquires a telepathic link to those around him, but the responsibility proves more than he is prepared for when he becomes aware of a suicide bomber aboard his flight.

Plot
Aboard an airplane, teenager Keith Barnes annoys those around him with his drum sticks and argues with a flight attendant when she tells him to turn off his portable radio. When he accidentally drops his radio into the bathroom sink, a lightning storm transforms it into a telepathic tuning device. He begins to hear the thoughts of the people around him in the plane, and then even sees the world through their eyes. From his seat, he sees a man strapping a bomb to himself in the bathroom mirror. He tells the flight attendant about the bomb, but due to his earlier shenanigans she does not believe him.

Keith recognizes Mr. Williams, the man seated next to him, as the bomber by the ring and wristwatch on his right hand. He puts his radio headphones back on and learns that Williams is distraught over the death of his wife and child in an airplane crash due to airline negligence. He intends to destroy the plane as revenge. Keith tries to talk him out of it. This backfires, as the revelation that Keith knows of his plan galvanizes Williams into taking immediate action, getting up from his seat and grasping the bomb trigger. Keith sneaks up behind him and puts the headphones over his ears. Hearing the pleading thoughts of the frightened passengers, Williams is filled with remorse and relents. As Williams is taken away, Keith decides he has had enough of the radio and drops it on the floor, allowing it to be crushed by the departing passengers.

External links
 

1987 American television episodes
The Twilight Zone (1985 TV series season 2) episodes
Television episodes about telepathy
Television episodes about terrorism

fr:Fréquence spéciale